Vermel Marie Whalen (née Scott; June 28, 1928 – March 13, 2013) was a member of the Ohio House of Representatives, serving a Cleveland area district from 1986 to 1998.

Whelan was born in Portageville, Missouri and went to the local high school there. She moved to Cleveland, Ohio. Whelan went to Dyke College, University of Georgia, and Cleveland State University where she received her certificates. Whelan served as a nurse in Cleveland. She was the administrator of the Comprehensive Employment and Training Act for the city of Cleveland. Whelan also served as assistant administrator for the city recreation department. She died in 2013 of cancer in Cleveland, Ohio.

References

External links
Profile from George Washington Williams 
Choice Legislation

Women state legislators in Ohio
Democratic Party members of the Ohio House of Representatives
Politicians from Cleveland
People from Portageville, Missouri
1928 births
2013 deaths
American nurses
American women nurses
Cleveland State University alumni
University of Georgia alumni
Deaths from cancer in Ohio
21st-century American women